Joe Gagnon (1918–2001) was a Canadian amateur boxer in flyweight category.

In 1938 (20 years old), he was the winner of the silver medal at the 1938 British Empire Games in Sydney, Australia.

Joe Gagnon had fought 125 times in his career, winning all but eight of his bouts. Included a total of 55 knockouts. He never lost by knockout.

In 1997, he was admitted to the Canadian Boxing Hall of Fame.

His career started in 1933 (15 years old) at the Griffintown Boy's Club. He became champion of Montreal (16 years old), of the province of Quebec and of Canada (18 years old). Several memorables bouts including a 1940 win over Johnny Greco despite giving away 15 pounds. Joe Gagnon also defeated Gerry Blanchard, Fernando Gagnon and Danny Webb. One of the eight losses by decision of the referee came against future world welterweight and middleweight champion Sugar Ray Robinson, who was visiting Montréal in 1938. Gagnon went the distance, but suffering a badly cut lip in the opening round. It was the first defeat in an international bout on the continent. Turning pro, he fought four times before retiring of boxing.  In 1957, he was named boxing coach at Palestre Nationale of Montréal.

References 

1918 births
2001 deaths
Boxers at the 1938 British Empire Games
Commonwealth Games silver medallists for Canada
Canadian male boxers
Commonwealth Games medallists in boxing
Flyweight boxers
Medallists at the 1938 British Empire Games